William Venroe Chappell Jr. (February 3, 1922 – March 30, 1989) was an American Democratic politician from Florida who served in the U.S. House of Representatives from 1969 to 1989.

Early life, education and military service
Born in Kendrick, Florida, Chappell graduated from the University of Florida with a Bachelor of Arts in 1947 and a Bachelor of Laws in 1949.  The Bachelor of Laws was exchanged for a Juris Doctor in 1967.

He served in the United States Navy, aviator from 1942 to 1946. He retired as a captain from United States Navy Reserve in 1983.

Legal career and government service
Chappell began his legal career as a prosecuting attorney in Marion County from 1950 to 1954. He later was a member of the law firm of Chappell and Rowland in Ocala.

Chappell represented Marion County in the Florida House of Representatives from 1954 to 1964, and served as Speaker of the House from 1961 to 1963. He did not seek reelection in 1964 but was elected again in 1966 from a district encompassing Marion, Citrus, Hernando, and Sumter Counties.

Congressional career 
When incumbent Congressman Syd Herlong retired in 1968, Chappell ran for and was elected to Florida's 4th congressional district. He was re-elected nine times.

Chappell was a moderate to conservative Democrat and served on the United States House Appropriations Committee. At the time of his defeat he was serving as chairman of the United States House Appropriations Subcommittee on Defense.

He was defeated in the 1988 general election by Republican Craig James, losing narrowly 50.2–49.8%.

Personal life and legacy 
Chappell married the former Jeane Brown on September 28, 1985. He was a resident of Ocala, Florida, until his death in Bethesda, Maryland, on March 30, 1989 from bone cancer.

The Port Orange Causeway, spanning the Halifax River, in Port Orange, Florida, was named the Congressman William V. Chappell Jr. Memorial Bridge by the Florida Legislature in 1989.

The U.S. Department of Veterans Affairs Outpatient Clinic in Daytona Beach, Florida was posthumously named after him.

References 

 

1922 births
1989 deaths
People from Marion County, Florida
Democratic Party members of the Florida House of Representatives
Speakers of the Florida House of Representatives
University of Florida alumni
Florida lawyers
Democratic Party members of the United States House of Representatives from Florida
United States Navy officers
United States Navy reservists
Deaths from bone cancer
20th-century American politicians
Fredric G. Levin College of Law alumni
Deaths from cancer in Maryland
United States Navy pilots of World War II
20th-century American lawyers